Carlos Javier Grossmüller (born 4 May 1983) is a Uruguayan football manager and former player who played as a midfielder. He is the current manager of Bella Vista.

Career
Born in Montevideo, Uruguay, Grossmüller began his footballing career in 1988, at the age of five, as a youth player with his local team, Ombu. He stayed as a player for eight years before moving to Primera División Uruguaya side Danubio where he started his professional career though he only played 36 games in seven years. In 2004, he was sent on loan to Centro Atlético Fénix where he made six appearances in the Segunda División Uruguay before going back to Danubio. During the next two seasons at Danubio, he went on to play 52 league games and netted 13 goals which prompted interest from German side Schalke 04 with whom he signed a four-year contract in 2007. His first goal in the Bundesliga, a free kick against Werder Bremen, went on to be nominated as "Goal of the Month" in German television. On 31 August 2009, he returned to his former club Danubio on loan until 30 June 2010. On 30 July 2010, he was signed by newly promoted Serie A side Lecce. After Lecce were relegated at the end of the 2011–12 season, he returned to Uruguay and joined C.A. Peñarol on 22 August 2012.

International career
He made his début with the Uruguay national team against Mexico in 2003.

References

External links
 

Living people
1983 births
Footballers from Montevideo
Association football midfielders
Uruguayan footballers
Uruguay international footballers
Danubio F.C. players
Centro Atlético Fénix players
FC Schalke 04 players
FC Schalke 04 II players
U.S. Lecce players
Peñarol players
C.A. Cerro players
Club Universitario de Deportes footballers
Sandefjord Fotball players
Uruguayan Primera División players
Bundesliga players
Serie A players
Eliteserien players
Expatriate footballers in Germany
Expatriate footballers in Italy
Expatriate footballers in Peru
Expatriate footballers in Norway
Uruguayan people of German descent
Uruguayan expatriate footballers
Uruguayan expatriate sportspeople in Italy
Uruguayan expatriate sportspeople in Peru
Uruguayan expatriate sportspeople in Norway
Uruguayan football managers
C.A. Bella Vista managers